Observador is a Portuguese online newspaper started on May 19, 2014. It is the only Portuguese newspaper in Portugal with a defined political orientation (right-wing liberalism).

In what was almost a unique concept at the time of launch, it is a completely digital newspaper with no printed edition, with the exception of the Anniversary and Lifestyle editions. Observador commits itself to publish and update information on a 24/7 basis.

In the first month, it reported 630,000 visitors. By August 2015, it reported six million visitors and 35 million pageviews. In January 2020, it reported 6.79 million visitors and 51.34 million pageviews.

In its first year, the newspaper won the "Launch of the Year" award in the Meios & Publicidade Awards. It also elected as newspaper of the year in 2018 by the same organization and it won the 2019 Edition of the Marktest award in "Press and Digital - Media".

Rádio Observador 

On 27 June 2019, Rádio Observador launched on 98.7 MHz in the Lisbon Metropolitan Area with about 30 collaborators.

In October 2019, it launched on 98.4 MHz in the Porto Metropolitan Area.

The Radio focuses on Information but also airs music. Its many programs are also published in Podcast format.

References 

2014 establishments in Portugal
Portuguese websites
Publications established in 2014
Portuguese-language newspapers
Newspapers published in Lisbon